The Pacific Command Water Transport Company, RCASC, was a secret freight-patrol shipping unit of the Canadian Army based at Vancouver, British Columbia, during the Second World War.  The unit fell under the jurisdiction of Pacific Command, the Canadian Army formation responsible for defending the Pacific Coast of Canada against Japanese attack.

History
Based at the Old Vancouver Hotel and the RCASC wharf (Vancouver) under the command of Major C.G. Matthews, the Pacific Command Water Transport Company of the Royal Canadian Army Service Corps was formed in 1942, utilizing fishing packers and seiners leased from local civilians for army use. The company was tasked with resupplying camps established to build a telephone line from British Columbia to Dutch Harbor, Alaska, after the Aleutian Islands Attu and Kiska were occupied by Japanese Imperial Forces. Upon completion of the communication link, the Water Transport Company was assigned with resupplying freight and personnel to remote Royal Canadian Air Force radar stations on the west coast of British Columbia, basing ships at Coal Harbour, Port Alberni, and Prince Rupert. The company maintained an estimated 70 vessels (including scows) in its order-of-battle, each motor vessel mounted with a twin-Lewis Gun .303 battery and Lee–Enfield rifles for all crewmembers, usually eight other-ranks soldiers.

On 6 March 1945, after the munitions freighter Greenhill Park exploded in Vancouver harbour, the MV General Kennedy, MV General Mackenzie, MV Brigadier Sutherland Brown, and MV General Cotton (skippered by Warrant Officer 'Dutchy' Knox) rendered assistance, towing the stricken vessel to outer harbour in preparation for beaching. The company also towed targets for Royal Canadian Artillery coastal gunnery practice. Ships in the Water Transport Company, RCASC, sailed under their own distinctive flag, a maritime blue ensign with crossed swords on the fly. The company was disbanded in 1945.

Ships
MLC No. 42
MV Anna M (Z49) (Skipper: G. Wilson)
MV Brigadier Sutherland Brown
MV Brigadier D.J. Macdonald
MV Colonel Greer
MV Colonel Holmes
MV Colonel Lawson
MV Colonel Ogilvy
MV Colonel Peters
MV Colonel Roy
MV Colonel Stuart
MV Colonel Wadmore
MV Colonel Ward
MV Colonel Robinson
MV General Anderson (Z27)
MV General Cotton (Z72) (Skipper: W.O. 'Dutchy' Knox)
MV General Hertzberg
MV General Kennedy
MV General Lake
MV General Leckie
MV General Mackenzie
MV Good Partner

PPL 42
PPL 45
PPL 144
RCASC No. 2 (scow)
RCASC No. 5
RCASC No. 6
RCASC No. 9
RCASC No. 10
RCASC No. 23 (range target-towing speed boat)
RCASC No. 26

See also

Pacific Command (Canadian Army)

Sources
 Cliff Faulknor, RCASC, The Unknown Service (unpublished), 2002
 Library and Archives Canada File No. 3225 War Diary of Pacific Command Water Transport Company, RCASC, Ottawa, 1945.
 Knight, Darrell The West Coast Privateers: a History of the Pacific Command "WATER TRANSPORT COMPANY" of the Royal Canadian Army Service Corps (300-page manuscript, unpublished) Calgary, 2008

Military units and formations of the Canadian Army
Military units and formations of Canada in World War II
Military logistics units and formations of Canada
Military units and formations established in 1942
Military units and formations disestablished in 1945